Deaf studies are academic disciplines concerned with the study of the deaf social life of human groups and individuals. These constitute an interdisciplinary field that integrates contents, critiques, and methodologies from anthropology, cultural studies, economics, geography, history, political science, psychology, social studies, and sociology, among others. The field focuses on the language, culture, and lives of the deaf from the social instead of the medical perspective.

Deaf studies are also described as those comprising the scientific study of the deaf-related aspects of the world.

Background 
Deaf studies emerged with the recognition that deaf people have a culture and that such culture is unique, requiring alternative ways of understanding this segment of the population outside of pathological frameworks. The University of Bristol began using the term "deaf studies" in 1984 after the founding of the Centre for Deaf Studies in 1968. Scholars began identifying themselves with the field, particularly after degree-granting programs in Deaf Studies began to emerge in the United Kingdom and the United States from the late 1970s to the 1980s. The first master's degree on Deaf Studies was introduced at the University of Bristol in 1992.

Areas 
Studying the lives of those who are deaf include learning about their culture, sign language, history and their human rights. Being involved in "Deaf Studies" means focusing on the sociological, historical and linguistic aspects of the deaf and hearing impaired. Within this, it prepares individuals to work with the deaf and hearing impaired. Those who participate and join this field of study are involved with promoting the change of views and perspectives of the larger society regarding Deaf people. Some perspectives of larger society, such as the belief that deafness is a disability, can result in deaf studies being related to the field of disability studies, although not all deaf people agree that deafness should be connected to disabilities. There is also an intersection of these fields in the study of those who are deaf plus, meaning both Deaf and disabled.

Deaf studies includes the study of:
Deaf culture
Deaf people
Sign language
Deaf history
Body Language
Social Skills
Personal Skills

University-based deaf studies centers
 United States
 Masters offered
Washington University in St. Louis, St. Louis, MO
Gallaudet University, Washington, D.C.
Lamar University, Beaumont, Texas
California State University, Northridge, Northridge, California
McDaniel College, Westminster, Maryland
 Bachelors offered
Boston University, Boston, MA
 California State University, Northridge, Northridge, California
 California State University, Sacramento, Sacramento, California
 Columbia College Chicago, Chicago, Illinois
 Gallaudet University, Washington, D.C. 
 Lamar University, Beaumont, Texas
 Towson University, Towson, Maryland
 Utah Valley University, Orem, Utah
 Keuka College Keuka Park, New York
 State Certifications
 Texas Woman's University, Denton, Texas (offers Masters in Deaf Education)
Cincinnati State, Community College in Cincinnati Ohio (Offers masters, Interpreter Training Program ITP) 
 Associate in Arts offered
 Bristol Community College, Fall River, MA
College of the Holy Cross, Worcester, MA
 Ohlone College, Fremont, CA
 Utah Valley University, Orem, Utah
 United Kingdom
 University of Central Lancashire, Lancashire, England
 Centre for Deaf Studies, Bristol, University of Bristol, Bristol
 University of Wolverhampton, Wolverhampton, England  
York Saint John University, York, England 
 New Zealand
 Victoria University of Wellington
 Germany
 Humboldt University, Berlin  
 Hong Kong
 Centre for Sign Linguistics and Deaf Studies, The Chinese University of Hong Kong, Hong Kong 
 India
National Institute of Speech and Hearing, Kerala, India (offers Degree in Deaf Education)
 The Netherlands
 Visual Language, Signs and Gestures, Max Planck Institute for Psycholinguistics, Nijmegen
 Czech republic
 Ustav jazyku a komunikace neslysicich (Institute of Deaf Studies), Faculty of Arts, Charles University, Prague

National and transnational Deaf studies centers
 New Zealand
 Kelston Deaf Education Centre
 Philippines
 School of Deaf Education and Applied Studies, De La Salle–College of Saint Benilde

Deaf studies associations
 United States
 CSUN Deaf Studies Association, Northridge, California
 United Kingdom
 The British Association of Teachers of the Deaf

Deaf-related major projects
 India
 Deafchild India

See also
 American Annals of the Deaf
 Journal of Deaf Studies and Deaf Education
 Deaf Bibliography for a categorised list of publications in the field since 1984
Deaf history
 Deafhood
 Sign Language Studies

References